In commutative algebra and field theory, the Frobenius endomorphism (after Ferdinand Georg Frobenius) is a special endomorphism of commutative rings with prime characteristic , an important class which includes finite fields. The endomorphism maps every element to its -th power. In certain contexts it is an automorphism, but this is not true in general.

Definition
Let  be a commutative ring with prime characteristic  (an integral domain of positive characteristic always has prime characteristic, for example).  The Frobenius endomorphism F is defined by

for all r in R.  It respects the multiplication of R:

The expression  can be expanded using the binomial theorem.

if . Thus

This shows that F is a ring homomorphism.

If  is a homomorphism of rings of characteristic , then 

This means that the Frobenius endomorphism is a natural transformation from the identity functor on the category of characteristic  rings to itself.

If the ring  is a ring with no nilpotent elements, then the Frobenius endomorphism is injective:  means , which by definition means that  is nilpotent of order at most .  In fact, this is necessary and sufficient, because if  is any nilpotent, then one of its powers will be nilpotent of order at most . In particular, if  is a field then the Frobenius endomorphism is injective.

The Frobenius morphism is not necessarily surjective, even when  is a field. Then the image of  does not contain . If it did, then there would be a rational function  whose -th power  would equal .

A field  is called perfect if either it is of characteristic zero or it is of positive characteristic and its Frobenius endomorphism is an automorphism.  For example, all finite fields are perfect.

Fixed points of the Frobenius endomorphism 
Consider the finite field . By Fermat's little theorem, every element  of  satisfies . Equivalently, it is a root of the polynomial . The elements of  therefore determine  roots of this equation, and because this equation has degree  it has no more than  roots over any extension.

Let  be a ring of characteristic . If  is an integral domain, then by the same reasoning, the fixed points of Frobenius are the elements of the prime field.  However, if  is not a domain, then  may have more than  roots; for example, this happens if .

Iterating the Frobenius map gives a sequence of elements in :

This sequence of iterates is used in defining the Frobenius closure and the tight closure of an ideal.

As a generator of Galois groups 
The Galois group of an extension of finite fields is generated by an iterate of the Frobenius automorphism. First, consider the case where the ground field is the prime field . Let  be the finite field of  elements, where . The Frobenius automorphism  of  fixes the prime field , so it is an element of the Galois group . In fact, since  is cyclic with  elements,

If , then the Frobenius automorphism  of  does not fix the ground field , but its th iterate  does.

The Frobenius automorphism is not a generator of the absolute Galois group

because this Galois group is isomorphic to the profinite integers

which are not cyclic. Consequently, it is a topological generator in the usual Krull topology on the absolute Galois group.

Frobenius for schemes 
There are several different ways to define the Frobenius morphism for a scheme.  The most fundamental is the absolute Frobenius morphism.  However, the absolute Frobenius morphism behaves poorly in the relative situation because it pays no attention to the base scheme.  There are several different ways of adapting the Frobenius morphism to the relative situation, each of which is useful in certain situations.

The absolute Frobenius morphism 
Suppose that  is a scheme of characteristic . The ring  is an -algebra, so it admits a Frobenius endomorphism. The absolute Frobenius morphism is a natural transformation from the identity functor on the category of -schemes to itself.

In general, however, it is not. For example, consider the ring . Let  and  both equal  with the structure map  being the identity. It is not a morphism of -algebras. If it were, then multiplying by an element  in  would commute with applying the Frobenius endomorphism. But this is not true because:

The absolute Frobenius morphism is a purely inseparable morphism of degree . Its differential is zero.

Restriction and extension of scalars by Frobenius 
Suppose that  is the structure morphism for an -scheme .  The base scheme  has a Frobenius morphism FS.  Composing  with FS results in an -scheme XF called the restriction of scalars by Frobenius.  The restriction of scalars is actually a functor, because an -morphism  induces an -morphism .

For example, consider a ring A of characteristic  and a finitely presented algebra over A:

The action of A on R is given by:

where α is a multi-index.  Let .  Then  is the affine scheme , but its structure morphism , and hence the action of A on R, is different:

For example, if  and SF are both finite type, then so is XF.

The extension of scalars by Frobenius is defined to be:

The projection onto the  factor makes  an -scheme. Like restriction of scalars, extension of scalars is a functor: An -morphism  determines an -morphism .

As before, consider a ring A and a finitely presented algebra R over A, and again let .  Then:

where α is a multi-index and every aiα and bi is an element of A.  The action of an element c of A on this section is:

Consequently,  is isomorphic to:

where, if:

then:

A similar description holds for arbitrary A-algebras R.

Because extension of scalars is base change, it preserves limits and coproducts.  This implies in particular that if  has an algebraic structure defined in terms of finite limits (such as being a group scheme), then so does .  Furthermore, being a base change means that extension of scalars preserves properties such as being of finite type, finite presentation, separated, affine, and so on.

Extension of scalars is well-behaved with respect to base change: Given a morphism , there is a natural isomorphism:

Relative Frobenius 
Let  be an -scheme with structure morphism .

defined by the universal property of the pullback  (see the diagram above):

Because the absolute Frobenius morphism is natural, the relative Frobenius morphism is a morphism of -schemes.

Consider, for example, the A-algebra:

We have:

The relative Frobenius morphism is the homomorphism  defined by:

Relative Frobenius is a universal homeomorphism. If  is an open immersion, then it is the identity.

X is unramified over  if and only if FX/S is unramified and if and only if FX/S is a monomorphism. X is étale over  if and only if FX/S is étale and if and only if FX/S is an isomorphism.

Arithmetic Frobenius 

The arithmetic Frobenius morphism of an -scheme  is a morphism:

defined by:

That is, it is the base change of FS by 1X.

Again, if:

then the arithmetic Frobenius is the homomorphism:

If we rewrite  as:

then this homomorphism is:

Geometric Frobenius 
Let  denote the -scheme .

If:

then extending scalars by  gives:

If:

then we write:

and then there is an isomorphism:

The geometric Frobenius morphism of an -scheme  is a morphism:

defined by:

Continuing our example of A and R above, geometric Frobenius is defined to be:

Arithmetic and geometric Frobenius as Galois actions 
If  is the spectrum of a finite field, then its automorphism group is the Galois group of the field over the prime field, and the Frobenius morphism and its inverse are both generators of the automorphism group.

Consider the set of K-points .  This set comes with a Galois action: Each such point x corresponds to a homomorphism  from the structure sheaf to K, which factors via k(x), the residue field at x, and the action of Frobenius on x is the application of the Frobenius morphism to the residue field.  This Galois action agrees with the action of arithmetic Frobenius: The composite morphism

is the same as the composite morphism:

by the definition of the arithmetic Frobenius.  Consequently, arithmetic Frobenius explicitly exhibits the action of the Galois group on points as an endomorphism of X.

Frobenius for local fields 
Given an unramified finite extension  of local fields, there is a concept of Frobenius endomorphism which induces the Frobenius endomorphism in the corresponding extension of residue fields.

Suppose  is an unramified extension of local fields, with ring of integers OK of  such that the residue field, the integers of  modulo their unique maximal ideal , is a finite field of order , where  is a power of a prime.

Frobenius for global fields

where  is the order of the residue field .

Lifts of the Frobenius are in correspondence with p-derivations.

Examples
The polynomial

has discriminant

,

and so is unramified at the prime 3; it is also irreducible mod 3. Modulo  this polynomial is

.

However, they are of degree 120, the order of the Galois group, illustrating the fact that explicit computations are much more easily accomplished if -adic results will suffice.

If  is an abelian extension of global fields, we get a much stronger congruence since it depends only on the prime  in the base field . For an example, consider the extension   of  obtained by adjoining a root  satisfying

This extension is cyclic of order five, with roots

for integer . It has roots which are Chebyshev polynomials of :

give the result of the Frobenius map for the primes 2, 3 and 5, and so on for larger primes not equal to 11 or of the form  (which split). It is immediately apparent how the Frobenius map gives a result equal mod  to the -th power of the root .

See also

Perfect field
Frobenioid

Universal homeomorphism

References

Finite fields
Algebraic number theory
Galois theory